Róbert Mazáň ( born 9 February 1994) is a Slovak professional football player who plays as a left back for Bulgarian First League club Hebar Pazardzhik and the Slovakia national football team.

Club career

AS Trenčín
Mazáň made his debut in the November 2011, 2–0 Corgoň Liga loss against DAC Dunajská Streda.

FK Senica
On 2 February 2014, Mazáň signed a new two and a half year contract that ran until 30 June 2016 with Senica.

Celta Vigo
Mazáň joined Celta Vigo, despite apparent interest from Benfica and Atalanta Bergamo. He joined the club, to which his childhood friend and former team-mate from AS Trenčín, Stanislav Lobotka, signed to just few weeks prior. Mazáň had expressed that this is a huge moment in his career, remarking that while at Podbeskidzie, he felt unappreciated. He had also expressed an interest in getting a spot on Celta's first team.

In his first season, however, he played more minutes in the Slovak national team than at Celta, starting only in two games, against Deportivo Alavés and Levante. His post of a left-back was largely filled by Jonny Castro.

Ironically, his first game at Celta, in which he completed the entire 90 minutes, was against later 2018–19 La Liga champions - FC Barcelona at Camp Nou, on 22 December 2018. After the game, Barcelona's first goal, after the frequent Alba–Messi combination, was partly blamed on Mazáň. This was the only game Mazáň starred in for Celta in the 2018–19 season, as Celta sent him on a loan to Serie B, during the winter transfer period.

Loan at Venezia
In late January 2019, it was announced that Mazáň would join Venezia on a half-season loan, to collect more play time. Just as Celta, Venezia too had been battling relegation in its respective league. Mazáň had made a debut against Livorno on 24 February 2019, playing 90 minutes of the 0:1 defeat. He also played the full-time against Perugia, three days later, playing against his fellow Slovak and a member of the wider national team squad, Norbert Gyömbér, in a 2:3 defeat.

During an interview, while preparing with the national team in June 2019, Mazáň had revealed, that he fell on harder times initially, after the departure of Walter Zenga, who chose him from Celta, and the arrival of Serse Cosmi. Nonetheless, by the end of the season under Cosmi, Mazáň made three 90 minute appearances. After the conclusion of the loan, Mazáň had stated that he was prepared to return to Spain and fight for his position in the first team. In Venice, he played in 7 games, overall.

Loan to Tenerife
On 24 July 2019, Mazáň was loaned out to Segunda División side CD Tenerife, for one year.

FK Mladá Boleslav
On 11 September 2020, Mazáň signed a new contract with Mladá Boleslav. Mazáň departed from Mladá Boleslav after 13 games in February 2021, after no longer being a part of plans of Karel Jarolím.

MFK Karviná
On 9 February 2021, on his birthday, he signed a half-season deal with Karviná, where he was desired by the manager Juraj Jarábek.

International career
Mazáň was first called up to Slovakia's senior national football team in September 2017, for a double qualification matchday in a 2018 FIFA World Cup qualifying campaign, as an alternative for Dušan Švento, who was troubled with an injury. He did not make a cap in a game against Slovenia or England, but he was also called up for the October double matchday, making his debut against Malta, on 8 October 2017, substituting Tomáš Hubočan in the 87th minute. Slovakia won the game 3–0 and sealed the 2nd place in Group F, yet it failed to qualify for the play-offs. By the end of the year, he also appeared in a friendly fixture against Norway.

In 2018 Mazáň was called up to 2018 King's Cup. In the semi-finals against UAE (2–1 win), he substituted Tomáš Hubočan, in the 78th minute, however 3 days later he played the entire match for the first time in national team against Thailand in a 3–2 victory.

Mazáň continued to spend most of 2018, with the senior national team, mainly covering for the long-term international left-back Tomáš Hubočan, who suffered from low play time at Olympique Marseille. However, with the arrival of Pavel Hapal to the national team, he lost the spot in the nomination in November 2018, failing to regain it even in the March 2019, despite his move to Venezia and higher play time.

Honours

MŠK Žilina
Fortuna Liga: Winners: 2016-17

Career statistics

References

External links
AS Trenčín profile

1994 births
Living people
Sportspeople from Trenčín
Slovak footballers
Slovakia youth international footballers
Slovakia under-21 international footballers
Slovakia international footballers
Slovak expatriate footballers
Association football defenders
Slovak Super Liga players
AS Trenčín players
FK Senica players
MŠK Žilina players
Ekstraklasa players
La Liga players
Podbeskidzie Bielsko-Biała players
RC Celta de Vigo players
Serie B players
Venezia F.C. players
CD Tenerife players
Segunda División players
FK Mladá Boleslav players
MFK Karviná players
Czech First League players
AEL Limassol players
Cypriot First Division players
FC Hebar Pazardzhik players
First Professional Football League (Bulgaria) players
Slovak expatriate sportspeople in Poland
Slovak expatriate sportspeople in Spain
Slovak expatriate sportspeople in Italy
Slovak expatriate sportspeople in the Czech Republic
Slovak expatriate sportspeople in Cyprus
Slovak expatriate sportspeople in Bulgaria
Expatriate footballers in Poland
Expatriate footballers in Spain
Expatriate footballers in Italy
Expatriate footballers in the Czech Republic
Expatriate footballers in Cyprus
Expatriate footballers in Bulgaria